Traungold Cave (no. 1623/231 in the Austrian Cave Register) is a cave which has provided shelter and storage space to the Cambridge University Caving Club during their expeditions to Austria. Entrance E and F are two ends of a large stone arch, which has been developed into a bivouac shelter known as the "Stone Bridge." The location allows easy access to Steinbrücken Cave for exploration trips. Over the years the floor has been remodelled by filling in holes with stones to create more flat ground, and during this process the connection between entrances E and F and the rest of the cave was filled in.  Food must be stored off the floor in hammocks to avoid becoming infested by mice.

Between expeditions, gear and food are stored inside B entrance.

References

External links
 Traungoldhöhle on the Cambridge University Caving Club website

Caves of Austria
Limestone caves
Wild caves